An edge-localized mode (ELM) is a disruptive instability occurring in the edge region of a tokamak plasma due to the quasi-periodic relaxation of a transport barrier previously formed during a transition from low to high-confinement mode. This phenomenon was first observed in the ASDEX tokamak in 1981. Diamagnetic effects in the model equations expand the size of the parameter space in which solutions of repeated sawteeth can be recovered compared to a resistive MHD model. An ELM can expel up to 20 percent of the reactor's energy.

Issues 
ELM is a major challenge in magnetic fusion research with tokamaks, as these instabilities can:

 damage wall components (in particular divertor plates) by ablating them away due to their extremely high energy transfer rate (GW/m2); 
 potentially couple or trigger other instabilities, such as the resistive wall mode (RWM) or the neoclassical tearing mode (NTM).

Prevention and control
A variety of experiments/simulations have attempted to mitigate damage from ELM. Techniques include:

 injecting static magnetic noisy energy into the containment field as a containment-stabilization regime to decrease ELM amplitude. 
 injecting pellets to increase the frequency and thereby decrease the severity of ELM bursts (ASDEX Upgrade).
 multiple small-scale ELMs (000s/s) in tokamaks to prevent the creation of large ones, spreading the associated heat over a larger area and interval
 increase the plasma density and, at high densities, adjusting the topology of the magnetic field lines confining the plasma.

History
In 2003 DIII-D begn experimenting with resonant magnetic perturbations to control ELMs.

In 2006 an initiative (Project Aster) was started to simulate a full ELM cycle including its onset, the highly non-linear phase, and its decay. However, this did not constitute a “true” ELM cycle, since a true ELM cycle would require modeling the slow growth after the crash, in order to produce a second ELM. 

As of late 2011, several research facilities had demonstrated active control or suppression of ELMs in tokamak plasmas. For example, the KSTAR tokamak used specific asymmetric three-dimensional magnetic field configurations to achieve this goal.

In 2015, results of the first simulation to demonstrate repeated ELM cycling was published. 

In 2022, researchers began testing the small ELM hypothesis at JET to assess the utility of the technique.

See also 
 Resonant magnetic perturbations, used to control ELMs
 Plasma instability
 Tokamak

References

Further reading
 

Plasma physics